Nassar Al-Otaibi is a Kuwaiti taekwondo practitioner. He competed in the men's finweight at the 1988 Summer Olympics.

References

External links
 

Date of birth unknown
Place of birth unknown
Living people
Kuwaiti male taekwondo practitioners
Olympic taekwondo practitioners of Kuwait
Taekwondo practitioners at the 1988 Summer Olympics
Year of birth missing (living people)